Battell Park Historic District is a historic public park and national historic district located at Mishawaka, St. Joseph County, Indiana.  The district encompasses two contributing buildings, one contributing site, two contributing structures, and one contributing object in a public park.  It was established in 1881, and subsequently developed with a Soldiers' War Memorial erected in 1884 and Classical Revival style bandshell erected in 1927.  In 1936–1937, the Works Progress Administration added a five-tier, cascading rock garden with a waterfall, small pools, and arched bridge.

It was listed on the National Register of Historic Places in 1996.

References

Parks in Indiana
Works Progress Administration in Indiana
Historic districts on the National Register of Historic Places in Indiana
1881 establishments in Indiana
Neoclassical architecture in Indiana
Historic districts in St. Joseph County, Indiana
National Register of Historic Places in St. Joseph County, Indiana
Parks on the National Register of Historic Places in Indiana